Isaie Aldy Beausoleil (born April 21, 1902, date of death not found) was a Canadian convicted murderer who went by multiple alias who was on the FBI Ten Most Wanted Fugitives list in 1952, after a warrant of first degree murder was issued for him relating to the death of a 47 year old woman who was his girlfriend in Michigan in 1949.

Capture and aftermath
Beausoleil was captured in Chicago in 1953 while dressed as a woman when he was seen wearing a black satin bathing suit and a green skirt after it was revealed to be Beausoleil disguised in drag. And after there were reports of 'suspicious behaviour' in a women's restroom he was then arrested by the Federal Bureau of Investigation (FBI). Beausoleil was later charged and then sent to jail, and is now deceased, yet it is unknown what year that he died.

References

1902 births
FBI Ten Most Wanted Fugitives
Fugitives
Year of death missing